The 23rd Japan Record Awards ceremony was held on 31 December 1981 at the Imperial Theatre, Tokyo, and was broadcast live in Japan through the TBS Television network. The broadcast ran from 19:00 (JST) to 20:54 (JST). Keizō Takahashi hosted the ceremony for the thirteenth time.

The 23rd Japan Record Award went to Akira Terao for "Ruby no Yubiwa" (ja). "Ruby no Yubiwa" also won the Gold Award as well as the Lyricist, Composer, and Arranger Awards. Best Vocal Performance went to Hiromi Iwasaki for "Sumire Iro no Namida" (ja), and Best New Artist went to Masahiko Kondō for "Gin Gira Gin ni Sarigenaku" (ja).

Presenters
 Main host
 Keizō Takahashi

 Progress hosts
 Kentaro Watanabe (TBS announcer)
 Keiko Takeshita

Nominees and winners

Japan Record Award
 "Ruby no Yubiwa" (ja)
 Artist: Akira Terao
 Lyricist: Takashi Matsumoto
 Composer: Akira Terao
 Arranger: Akira Inoue

Best Vocal Performance
 Hiromi Iwasaki – "Sumire Iro no Namida" (ja)

Best New Artist
 Masahiko Kondō – "Gin Gira Gin ni Sarigenaku" (ja)

New Artist Award
Best New Artist Award nominations.
 Masahiko Kondō – "Gin Gira Gin ni Sarigenaku" (ja)
 Takayuki Takemoto – "Terete Zin Zin"
 Yūko to Yayoi – "Otōsan"
 Yutaka Yamakawa – "Hakodate Honsen" (ja)
 Hiroyuki Okita – "Hamidashi Champion"

Gold Award
Japan Record Award nominations.
 Miyuki Kawanaka – "Anata Hitosuji"
 Shinichi Mori – "Inochi Ataete"
 Masako Mori – "Kanashimi Honsen Nihonkai" (ja)
 Hiroshi Itsuki – "Jinsei Kakurenbo" (ja)
 Kenji Sawada – "Stripper" (ja)
 Hiromi Iwasaki – "Sumire Iro no Namida" (ja)
 Hideki Saijo – "Sentimental Girl" (ja)
 Chanels – "Machikado Twilight" (ja)
 Toshiyuki Nishida – "Moshimo Piano ga Hajiketa nara" (ja)
 Akira Terao – "Ruby no Yubiwa" (ja)

Golden Idol Award
 Seiko Matsuda – "Kaze Tachinu" (ja)
 Tahara Toshihiko – "Good Luck Love" (ja)
 Naoko Kawai – "Smile For Me" (ja)
 Yoshie Kashiwabara – "Hello Goodbye" (ja)

Best Album Award 
 Off Course – We Are (ja)
 Yumi Matsutoya – Mizu no Naka no Asia e (ja)
 Eiichi Ohtaki – A Long Vacation

Best Ten Albums
 Off Course – We Are (ja)
 Tatsuro Yamashita – On the Street Corner 1
 Yasuko Agawa – Sunglow
 Southern All Stars – Stereo Taiyō-zoku (ja)
 Yumi Matsutoya – Mizu no Naka no Asia e (ja)
 The Venus – Love Portion No.1
 Miyuki Nakajima – Ringetsu
 Eiichi Ohtaki – A Long Vacation
 Creation – Lonely Heart (ja)

Lyricist Award
 Takashi Matsumoto – "Ruby no Yubiwa" (ja) (singer: Akira Terao)

Composer Award
Also known as the Shinpei Nakayama Award.
 Akira Terao – "Ruby no Yubiwa" (ja) (singer: Akira Terao)

Arranger Award
 Akira Inoue – "Ruby no Yubiwa" (ja) (singer: Akira Terao)

Special Award
 Utako Matsushima

Planning Award
 Masayoshi Takanaka, Kitty Films, Polydor Records – Niji Densetsu
 King Records – Uta wa Ikiteiru
 Saori Yuki, Toshiba EMI – Shōwa Tsuyasho

Long Seller Award
 Yujiro Ishihara – "Brandy Glass" (ja)
 George Yamamoto – "Michi no Kuhitori Tabi" (ja)
 Tetsuya Ryu – "Okuhida Bojō" (ja)

References

External links
 

1981
Japan Record Awards
Japan Record Awards
Japan Record Awards
Japan Record Awards